The Canton of Castagniccia is a canton of the Haute-Corse department, Corsica, France, named after the natural region of Castagniccia.
It was created at the French canton reorganisation which came into effect in March 2015. Its seat is in San-Nicolao.

It consists of the following communes:
 
Campana
Canale-di-Verde
Carcheto-Brustico
Carpineto
Cervione
Chiatra
Felce
Monacia-d'Orezza
Nocario
Novale
Ortale
Parata
Perelli
Piazzali
Piazzole
Piedicroce
Piedipartino 
Pie-d'Orezza
Pietra-di-Verde
Pietricaggio
Piobetta
Poggio-Mezzana
Rapaggio
San-Giovanni-di-Moriani
San-Giuliano
San-Nicolao
Santa-Lucia-di-Moriani
Santa-Maria-Poggio
Sant'Andréa-di-Cotone
Santa-Reparata-di-Moriani
Stazzona
Tarrano
Valle-d'Alesani
Valle-di-Campoloro
Valle-d'Orezza
Velone-Orneto
Verdèse

References

Cantons of Haute-Corse